Chantal Nobel (born Chantal Bonneau, 23 November 1948) is a French actress.

Life and career 
Chantal Nobel is mostly known for having played the main female role of Florence Berg in the French successful television series Châteauvallon. After the broadcast of an episode of the television program Champs-Élysées, she was victim of a terrible car accident in a Porsche 924 Carrera GT driven by the singer Sacha Distel, during the trip in the village of Maltaverne, a small village located next to Tracy-sur-Loire.

After six weeks in a coma, the face grievously injured and handicapped for life, she left the media to go to the South of France, ending at the same time the series Châteauvallon. She filed a complaint against Sacha Distel, who was then sentenced to one year in prison for involuntary injuries. During her hospitalization in 1985, three paparazzi entered her hospital room to take pictures of her against her will. The affair was followed with a condemnation of the paparazzi. The jurisprudence of the Court of Appeal of Paris on 17 March 1986, expanded the notion of domicile respect, indicating that the hospital room was considered as the private domicile of the patient during the recovery.

Personal life 
Chantal Nobel was born in Rouen in the department of Seine-Maritime, and has an older brother named Jacky. She is married to Jean-Louis Julian, a jeweller at Saint-Tropez and Courchevel, with whom she has one daughter named Anne-Charlotte. She also had from a previous relationship with producer Jacques-Henri Marin another daughter named Alexandra, born in 1971.

Filmography

Films 
 The Black Hand (1968) ... Éléonore
 La Honte de la famille (1969) ... Valérie Maspi
 La Grande Maffia... (1971) ... Mademoiselle Ducœurjoli
 L'Odeur des fauves (1972) ... Marie Fulton
 Le Permis de conduire (1974) ... the bank employee
 Les murs ont des oreilles (1974) ... Claudine
 Opération Lady Marlène (1975) ... Madame de Parcy
 L'Année sainte (1976) ... a stewardess
 Le Jour de gloire (1976) ... Mademoiselle Verger
 Te marre pas ... c'est pour rire ! (1982) ... Janine Royer, Marcello's assistant
 Flics de choc (1983) ... Wanda Romanoff
 Les parents ne sont pas simples cette année (1984) ... Alexandra Labruyère

Television 
 Aurore et Victorien (1974) ... Aurore's older sister
 La Lumière des justes (1979) ... Sophie de Champlitte / Sophie de Lambrefoux / Sophie Ozareff
 Salut champion (1981) ... Juliette Majoureau
 Châteauvallon (1985) ... Florence Berg

References

External links 

1948 births
Living people
20th-century French actresses
Actors from Rouen
French rally co-drivers
Dakar Rally co-drivers
Sportspeople from Seine-Maritime